Todd Woodbridge and Mark Woodforde were the defending champions but only Woodbridge competed that year with Jonas Björkman.

Björkman and Woodbridge lost in the semifinals to Mahesh Bhupathi and Leander Paes.

Bhupathi and Paes won in the final 7–6(7–3), 6–3 against Martin Damm and David Prinosil.

Seeds

Draw

Final

Top half

Bottom half

External links
 2001 Cincinnati Masters Doubles Draw

2001 Cincinnati Masters
Doubles